Veller is a surname. Notable people with the surname include:

Don Veller (1912–2006), American football player and coach
Mikhail Veller (born 1948), Estonian writer
Willi Veller (1896–1941), German Nazi politician and SA member

See also
Heller (surname)
Zeller (surname)